In public relations (PR) and marketing, a media contacts database is a resource which catalogs the names, contact information, and other details about people who work in various media professions. These include journalists, reporters, editors, publishers, contributors, freelance journalists, opinion writers, social media personalities/ influencers, TV show anchors, radio show hosts, DJs, and others.

A media contacts database usually contains the following information:

 Full name of the media contact,
 The publication or channel they work for
  (past and present)
 Topics they cover, or their beat
 Contact information found in public domains
 Online presence like blogs and other social networking sites
 Education Information

Overview
A media contacts database is a public relations tool that is maintained and used by PR professionals to pitch stories on a particular topic, product, or company to a specific group of journalists. These journalists would then write or speak about the particular topic in a relevant issue or episode of their shows.

A media contacts database allows a PR professional to gain easy access to hundreds of journalists within a short span of time. Media contacts database are created and sold by many media research companies that offer such PR software for professionals.

References

Public relations
Mass media
Social media
Mass media monitoring
Social information processing
Databases by subject